The 2002 season was the Oakland Raiders' 33rd in the National Football League (NFL), their 43rd overall, their eighth since returning to Oakland and their first under head coach Bill Callahan. The Raiders played their home games at Network Associates Coliseum as members of the AFC West. The Raiders had essentially traded their head coach Jon Gruden following the 2001 season. The Raiders hired Callahan, the offensive coordinator under Gruden, to return them to the playoffs.

Despite their talent, the Raiders struggled in the first half of the season. A 4–0 start was followed by four consecutive losses; the team's 4–4 record stunned many onlookers. The team, however, redeemed itself by winning seven of its final eight contests. In the third quarter of Oakland's 26–20 win on Monday Night Football over the Jets, Tim Brown became the third player in NFL history with 1,000 career catches. Finishing 11–5 in a conference where twelve teams obtained .500 or better records and nine were above .500, the Raiders won the AFC West for the third consecutive season and clinched the AFC's top seed and full home-field advantage throughout the playoffs. They routed the New York Jets and Tennessee Titans in the playoffs, by a combined score of 71–34 and +4 in turnover differential; in doing so, they advanced to their first Super Bowl since 1984. Their opponent was the Tampa Bay Buccaneers, led by their former coach Jon Gruden.

The Raiders entered Super Bowl XXXVII as slight favorites; many predicted a hard-fought showdown between Oakland's top-ranked offense and Tampa Bay's top-ranked defense. The resulting game, however, ended in disaster for the Raiders. An early three-point lead (courtesy of a Sebastian Janikowski field goal) evaporated as the Buccaneers scored 34 unanswered points. The Buccaneers defense, aided by Gruden's knowledge of the Raider offense and Raiders failure to change many of the terms for their offense, intercepted Rich Gannon three times during this scoring surge. Many times, Buccaneer safety John Lynch was able to determine what play was coming based on audibles called by Raider quarterback Rich Gannon. A furious Raider rally cut the score to an almost-competitive 21–34 in the fourth quarter. However, two more Gannon interceptions sealed the Raiders' fate in a 21–48 bludgeoning.

The years following the Super Bowl loss marked a period of decline and futility for the Raiders, earning neither a winning record nor a playoff trip until 2016. As of 2021, this represents the most recent AFC West title and postseason win for the Raiders.

The last remaining active member of the 2002 Oakland Raiders was kicker Sebastian Janikowski, who played his final NFL game in the 2018 season, although he missed the 2017 season.

Offseason

NFL Draft

Background
The 2002 season, due mainly to the aforementioned Super Bowl run, ranks among the most important in franchise history. The aging Raiders' controversial elimination from the prior year's playoffs set the stage for a concerted championship push. Owner Al Davis traded then-head coach Jon Gruden to the Tampa Bay Buccaneers shortly after the Raiders' 2001 playoff loss; in doing so, he received two first-round picks, two second-round picks, and cash considerations from Tampa Bay. Davis, despite team salary cap troubles, also managed to acquire veteran stars Sam Adams, Rod Woodson, and Bill Romanowski during the 2002 offseason.

The Raiders entered the season with a hugely talented, albeit aging roster of players. The offense was led by quarterback Rich Gannon, who would be named MVP for the season. The team's receiving corps of Tim Brown, Jerry Rice, and Jerry Porter ranked among the league's best; additionally, running back Charlie Garner posted 1,903 all-purpose yards. The offensive line, moreover, was anchored by pro-bowlers Lincoln Kennedy and Barret Robbins. The Raiders' offense, all told, led the league in total yardage; Gannon additionally led all NFL quarterbacks in passing with 4,689 yards. The defense, while less vaunted, nonetheless ranked among the NFL's finest; the contributions of Rod Woodson, Bill Romanowski, Charles Woodson, and Trace Armstrong aided the Raiders' cause greatly.

Staff

Roster

Rookies in italics

Regular season

Schedule

Game summaries

Week 1: vs. Seattle Seahawks

Week 5: at Buffalo Bills

Week 11: vs. New England Patriots

Week 13: vs. New York Jets

Week 15: at Miami Dolphins

Standings

Playoffs

AFC Divisional Playoff Game: vs. New York Jets

AFC Championship Game

The Raiders defeated the Titans and advanced to their first Super Bowl since Super Bowl XVIII, when they were based in Los Angeles. As of 2021, this has been the last time the Raiders won a playoff game, as they would not return to the playoffs again until 2016, and would be the last playoff game to be held at the Oakland Coliseum. The Raiders were approved to relocate to Las Vegas and played their inaugural Las Vegas season in 2020.

Heavy Metal band Metallica performed an unannounced pregame concert prior to the game, and the game’s national Anthem was performed by Joe Satriani.

Until the 2019–20 NFL playoffs, this was the last AFC championship game which did not include the Baltimore Ravens, Denver Broncos, Indianapolis Colts, New England Patriots, or Pittsburgh Steelers.

Super Bowl XXXVII

Awards and honors
 Rich Gannon, Bert Bell Award
 Rich Gannon, NFL MVP

References

External links
 Raiders on Pro Football Reference

Oakland Raiders seasons
AFC West championship seasons
American Football Conference championship seasons
Oakland
Raiders
Oakland